Paremhat 22 - Coptic Calendar - Paremhat 24

The twenty-third day of the Coptic month of Paremhat, the seventh month of the Coptic year. In common years, this day corresponds to March 19, of the Julian Calendar, and April 1, of the Gregorian Calendar. This day falls in the Coptic Season of Shemu, the season of the Harvest.

Commemorations

Prophets 

 The departure of the Righteous Daniel the Prophet

References 

Days of the Coptic calendar